Morgan Creek Vineyards is located in New Ulm, Brown County, southern Minnesota.

Wines
It specializes in growing and producing German, American, and French style wines, including Minnesota
cold-hardy varietals like the Marquette used in their recent Ten Thousand Vines wine. Ten Thousand Vines was developed with and sold exclusively through Fire Lake Grill in Minneapolis, Minnesota. Morgan Creek offers a variety of award-winning  dry to sweet red and white wines made from grapes such as Riesling, Gewurztraminer.

Winery
Morgan Creek boasts Minnesota's only underground winery which helps maintain temperatures ideal for wine production and aging. They offer a tasting room and both indoor and outdoors spaces for events. Morgan Creek Vineyards of Minnesota is an active member of the Minnesota Grape Growers Association, the Biodynamic Farming and Gardening Association and the Land Stewardship Project.

See also

References

External links
Official Morgan Creek Vineyards website

Wineries in Minnesota
New Ulm, Minnesota
Tourist attractions in Brown County, Minnesota
Companies based in Minnesota
Food and drink companies established in 1993
1993 establishments in Minnesota